Sturgeon Lake is a long, thin lake located in the Kenora District of Northwestern Ontario, Canada,  along the Manitoba-Ontario border from Hudson Bay and  from the Manitoba border.

The Sturgeon River flows north-west into and out of the lake, and eventually flows into Hudson Bay via the Hayes River.

See also
List of lakes in Ontario

References
Atlas of Canada topographic map sheet 53O accessed 2007-11-11
The Official Road Map of Ontario on-line section 18 accessed 2007-11-11

Lakes of Kenora District